Grogue, also known as grogu or grogo (derived from English grog), is a Cape Verdean alcoholic beverage, an aguardente made from sugarcane. Its production is fundamentally artisanal, and nearly all the sugarcane is used in the production of grogue. The cane is processed in a press known as a trapiche.

Grogue is the basis for a Cape Verdean cocktail known as ponche (derived from the English word "punch"), which also includes lime and molasses, comparable to the poncha of the island of Madeira.

Grogue and sugarcane production are primarily found in Santo Antão (notably Ribeira do Paul and Ribeira da Cruz) and Santiago.

Grogue is also used as a base for medicinal preparations, with the addition of herbs such as common rue, rosemary, or anise. There is also a grogue preparation made with percebes (goose neck barnacles).

Grogue is made by an old traditional way and because of this there are a lot of different qualities on the market. The government of Cabo Verde is now busy with a European company to introduce grogue on the European markets. This will be a fully controlled grogue of the best quality by the name 'Grogue Official'.

In some tourist locations, caipirinhas are prepared with grogue.

Gallery

References

Further reading
Mark Langworthy and Timothy J. Finan, "Sugar cane", Waiting for rain : agriculture and ecological imbalance in Cape Verde, Lynne Reinner Publishers, Boulder, CO, 1997, p. 109-111 
Richard A. Lobban Jr et Paul Khalil Saucier, "Grogga, grog, groggo, groggu", Historical dictionary of the Republic of Cape Verde, Scarecrow Press, Lanham, Maryland ; Toronto ; Plymouth, UK, 2007, p. 119 
Alain Huetz de Lemps, "Le grogue des îles du Cap-Vert" ("Grogue in the Capeverdean Islands"), Boissons et civilisations en Afrique, Presses Universitaires de Bordeaux (Bordeaux University Press), 2001, p. 466-467 
Nicolas Quint, Civilisation :"Les épiceries-bars et le grogue", Parlons capverdien : langue et culture'', Editions L'Harmattan, 2003, p. 116-117 

Cape Verdean cuisine
Drugs in Cape Verde
Rums